Jessica Elisabeth Angelique Folcker (born 9 July 1975), known professionally as Jessica, is a Swedish singer. Her debut album Jessica in 1998 used her mononym, whereas follow up album Dino credited Jessica Folker. Her following albums På svenska in 2005 and Skin Close in 2007 have used her full name Jessica Folcker. She is best known for her two international hits "Tell Me What You Like" and "How Will I Know (Who You Are)" both in 1998 and for "(Crack It) Something Going On" that featured her vocals and was a big hit for Bomfunk MC's in 2002.

Biography
Folcker was born as Jessica Elisabeth Angelique Folcker in Täby, Stockholm County, on 9 July 1975. Her mother is Swedish and her father is from Senegal.

Jessica attended Adolf Fredrik's Music School in Stockholm for six years until she was 17. Her big dream of becoming a singer, was fulfilled when she was engaged as a backing singer for the Ace of Base and Dr. Alban. She also performed the chorus in Leila K's hit "Electric" and did background vocals for E-Type.

On Jessica's debut album, named simply Jessica and released in the autumn 1998, she worked with composer and producer Max Martin, known for having written Britney Spears' Baby One More Time. The album was an instant hit, and Jessica became an international star overnight. As a result, Jessica travelled to Asia for a six-week-long promotional tour across Japan, the Philippines, South Korea, Taiwan and Thailand, resulting in high sales in the region, including selling gold. In South Korea, her remake of David Foster classic Goodbye was used as the theme ballad for the movie A Promise, and rapidly became the most frequently played song on South Korean radio.

In Sweden, Jessica peaked the top of the single charts with two singles from the album; How Will I Know (Who You Are) and Tell Me What You like, both selling platinum. She also won two prizes at the awards show of Sweden's major pop radio station, NRJ: New Artist of the Year as well as Swedish Female Artist of the Year. No artist before her had won more than one award until then.

In 2000, two years after releasing her debut album, Jessica Folcker's second album came out, called Dino, nicknamed after one of her producers. Besides Europe and Asia, Jessica wanted to conquer the US as well this time around. However, since many Americans pronounced her surname similar to "fucker", she decided to change her name to Folker instead, without the c. Jessica's first single from the album, To Be Able To Love, became a hit in the States, with a remix by DJ Jonathan Peters spending 10 weeks on the Billboard top 50 Dance Club Songs chart, and soon Jessica went on a club tour to New York and New Jersey.

Another of Jessica Folcker's songs – Lost Without Your Love – once again became the theme tune of another Korean film, Indian Summer. Again, Jessica reached the top of the South Korean airplay chart. In April 2001, Jessica's song Miracles was chosen as the theme melody for the Dutch Fame Academy replica, Starmaker. Due to this, she decided to release the song as her second single from the album, her sixth in total.

Jessica debuted in the Swedish national selection for the Eurovision Song Contest in 2005. In Melodifestivalen 2005, she performed Om natten. 2006 she tried again, participating in the third semi final heat of Melodifestivalen 2006 on March 4 with the song When Love's Comin' Back Again. She failed, however, to qualify for the semi final. She returned to Melodifestivalen 2014 together with Dr Alban where they both performed the duet Around the World, which placed 5th in the heat and did not qualify for the final.

Comeback 2007
Jessica worked in the studio on her fourth album since 2006. After working with several labels she is now signed with "Indie Label Cosmos Records." Her album was released in 2007 under the title Skin Close which had an Electronic/80's Pop-sound. It was her first English-record since 2000. The only song of the record that was released as a single was Snowflakes. The album failed to make an impact on the public.

Discography

Albums

Singles

Other releases
2001: "Lost Without Your Love"
2005: "Vad gör jag nu"
2005: "En annan sång"
2007: "Hot Night"
2013: "It's All About You''

Singles featured in

Other releases featured in
1994: "U make me feel alright" (Amadin)
1995: "Electric" (Leila K, chorus)
2013: "Respect Yourself" (DJ Bobo & Jessica Folcker – from DJ Bobo album Reloaded)

See also
Melodifestivalen 2005 (semifinals)
Melodifestivalen 2006 (semifinals)

References

External links
 Jessica Folcker fan site
 Jessica Folcker – Booking and events

1975 births
Living people
Swedish people of Senegalese descent
21st-century Swedish singers
21st-century Swedish women singers
English-language singers from Sweden
Melodifestivalen contestants of 2014
Melodifestivalen contestants of 2005